The Delaware River Region refers to an area in western New Jersey (USA) along the Delaware River border with Pennsylvania. It encompasses Burlington County, Camden County, Gloucester County, Mercer County, and Salem County. The area is primarily part of Greater Philadelphia with the exception of Mercer County, which is part of the New York City Metropolitan Area. It is one of six officially recognized tourism regions by the New Jersey Department of Tourism, the others being the Greater Atlantic City Region, the Skylands Region, the Southern Shore Region, the Shore Region and the Gateway Region.

References

External links
New Jersey's Western Frontier: The Delaware River Region
Delaware River Region tourism

Geography of Burlington County, New Jersey
Geography of Camden County, New Jersey
Geography of Gloucester County, New Jersey
Geography of Mercer County, New Jersey
Geography of Salem County, New Jersey
Delaware Valley
Tourism regions of New Jersey